Tomás Borrás y Bermejo (10 February 1891, Madrid - 26 August 1976, Madrid) was a Spanish journalist, novelist and playwright.

Life and career
He attended the Instituto San Isidro, leading to a degree in law, but he practiced for only a short time before deciding to change careers; having been a writer since his youth. He was married to the tonadillera and cupletista, Aurora Jaufrett, who performed under the name "".

Eventually, he became a journalist, beginning as a collaborator at the informal daily journal, during the dictatorship of Primo de Rivera, then took a position with the daily ABC and its associated magazine, Blanco y Negro. Later, he was a participant in the Juntas de Ofensiva Nacional-Sindicalista (JONS), which became the Falange.

He also held several minor political positions.

In 1953, he was named the Cronista Oficial de la Villa de Madrid (Official Chronicler of Madrid). Shortly after his death, the street where he had lived for much of his life was renamed for him. The Círculo de Bellas Artes placed a commemorative plaque at the corner.

Works 
He was very prolific; producing numerous novels and plays in addition to his journalistic work. He also had a fondness for verses and biographies.

His literary works include a collection of 203 very short stories (what would now be called "flash fiction") entitled Cuentos gnómicos (Gnomic Tales), which were published in thirteen volumes between 1940 and 1969. Sixty-four of the tales were selected for a later edition, published in 2013.

It is considered to be one of the first radio plays in which sound effects served as a fundamental presence.

References

External links

 Enrique Domínguez Millán, Borrás, el olvidado , La Tribuna de Cuenca, 24 April 2009. 
 El 200 de Beumarchais, artícle in ABC, 5 February 1932.
 Por España, artícle in ABC, 22 January 1936.

1891 births
1976 deaths
Spanish novelists
Spanish dramatists and playwrights
Spanish Falangists
Writers from Madrid
20th-century Spanish journalists